American record producer and songwriter Jack Antonoff has released three  studio albums and one soundtrack under the solo project Bleachers, and 10 studio albums, collectively, among his bands: fun., Steel Train, and Outline. He has also served as the co-writer or co-producer on albums by Taylor Swift, Lorde, Kevin Abstract, The Chicks, Lana Del Rey, and St. Vincent, and has written and produced individual tracks with artists including Pink, Sara Bareilles, Fifth Harmony, Troye Sivan, Carly Rae Jepsen, and Sia, among many others.

Production and writing credits

References

Production discographies